The women's +70 kg judo competition at the 2008 Summer Paralympics was held on September 9 at the Beijing Workers' Gymnasium. Preliminary rounds started at 12:00 pm CST. Repechage finals, semifinals, bouts for bronze medals, and the final were held at 5:30 pm CST.

This event was the heaviest of the women's judo weight classes, allowing competitors with over 70 kilograms of body mass. Like all other judo events, bouts lasted five minutes. If the bout was still tied at the end, it was extended for another five-minute, sudden-death period; if neither judoka scored during that period, the match is decided by the judges. The tournament bracket consisted of a single-elimination contest culminating in a gold medal match. There was also a repechage to determine the winners of the two bronze medals. Each judoka who had lost to a semifinalist competed in the repechage. The two judokas who lost in the semifinals faced the winner of the opposite half of the bracket's repechage in bronze medal bouts.

A total of seven judokas competed in the event. An eighth competitor, Anayasi Hernandez of Cuba, was disqualified for failing a pre-match medical exam. Her first round bout against Zoubida Bouazoug of Algeria was canceled, and Bouazoug received a bye into the next round.

Medalists

Tournament results

Repechage

References

External links
 

W71
Judo at the Summer Paralympics Women's Heavyweight
Paralympics W71